Renzo Rossellini (2 February 1908 – 13 May 1982) was an Italian composer, best known for his film scores.

Born in Rome, he was brother of director Roberto Rossellini and father of producer Franco Rossellini. He died in Monte Carlo.

He composed the scores of his brother's films, and others such as The Children Are Watching Us and Il segno di Venere.

He also wrote several ballets, oratorios, cantatas, four operas—La Guerra (1956), Il vortice (1958), Uno sguardo dal ponte (1961), L'Annonce faite à Marie (1970)—, symphonies, chamber music, and songs.

Selected filmography
 The Ancestor (1936)
 Under the Southern Cross (1938)
 Princess Tarakanova (1938)
 The White Ship (1941)
 A Pilot Returns (1942)
 Luisa Sanfelice (1942)
 Giarabub (1942)
 Noi Vivi (1942)
 Addio Kira (1942)
 Knights of the Desert (1942)
 A Garibaldian in the Convent (1942)
 The Two Orphans (1942)
 The Man with a Cross (1943)
 Maria Malibran (1943)
 The Tyrant of Padua (1946)
 Desire (1946)
 Before Him All Rome Trembled (1946)
 The Brothers Karamazov (1947)
 Europe '51 (1951)
 Fatal Symphony (1947)
 L'Amore (1948)
 Love and Blood (1951)
 Shadows Over Naples (1951)
 Rome-Paris-Rome (1951)
 Without a Flag (1951)
 Messalina (1951)
 A Woman Has Killed (1952)
 Repentance (1952)
 I'm the Hero (1952)
 The Machine to Kill Bad People (1952)
 Milady and the Musketeers (1952)
 We're Dancing on the Rainbow (1952)
 For You I Have Sinned (1953)
 House of Ricordi (1954)
 The Lovers of Manon Lescaut (1954)
 Orient Express (1954)

Awards
 Nastro d'Argento: Best Score for Paisà (1946) and for I fratelli Karamazoff (1947).

External links

1908 births
1982 deaths
Musicians from Rome
20th-century classical composers
Italian film score composers
Italian male film score composers
Italian opera composers
Male opera composers
Nastro d'Argento winners
20th-century Italian composers
20th-century Italian male musicians
Renzo